En concierto "Creeré" is the first live album and second DVD of the contemporary Christian latin pop duo Tercer Cielo. It was recorded in 2010 at a concert in the Coliseo de Puerto Rico and was released by Vene Music and Universal Music Latin on 29 June 2010. The album contains live performances of his greatest hits from the year 2007 to 2009.

Track listing

References 

2010 live albums
2010 video albums
Tercer Cielo live albums